Young Social Democrats may refer to:

 Young Social Democrats (Czech Republic), a social democratic youth organization in the Czech Republic
 Young Social Democrats (Estonia), the youth wing of the Social Democratic Party in Estonia
 Young Social Democrats (Slovakia), a social democratic youth organization in Slovakia
 Young Social Democrats, the youth wing of the Social Democrats,  USA in the United States
 Young Social Democrats, the youth wing of the Social Democratic Party in the United Kingdom

See also
 Social Democratic Youth (disambiguation)
 Young Socialists (disambiguation)
 International Union of Socialist Youth